Bhanpuri is a census town in Raipur District  in the state of Chhattisgarh, India.

Geography
It has an average elevation of 301 metres (987 feet).

Demographics
 India census, Bhanpuri had a population of 16,357. Males constitute 53% of the population and females 47%. Bhanpuri has an average literacy rate of 65%, higher than the national average of 59.5%; with male literacy of 74% and female literacy of 55%. 17% of the population is under 6 years of age.

References

Cities and towns in Raipur district